Yarrol is a rural locality in the North Burnett Region, Queensland, Australia.

History 
Yarrol Road State School opened on 3 June 1946. It was renamed Ventnor State School in July 1948. The school closed on 22 April 1960.

Geography
Gin Gin–Mount Perry–Monto Road runs through from south-east to south-west.

References 

North Burnett Region
Localities in Queensland